Ghulam Rasool Khan Jatoi is a Pakistani politician who had been a Member of the Provincial Assembly of Sindh, from May 2013 to May 2018.

Early life 

He was born on 30 April 1966 in Karachi.

Political career

He was elected to the Provincial Assembly of Sindh as a candidate of  National Peoples Party from Constituency PS-19 NAUSHERO FEROZE-I in 2013 Pakistani general election.

References

Living people
Sindh MPAs 2013–2018
Pakistan People's Party politicians
1966 births